Ficus natalensis is a tree in the family Moraceae. It is commonly known as the natal fig in South Africa. In central and western Uganda, where it has an important cultural value, it is known as omutuba to the Baganda people and omutoma to the Banyakitara peoples. In English is sometimes referred as barkcloth fig. It is commonly mistaken for its cousin the Ficus thonningii also known as mugumo to the Agikuyu. These trees are distributed from north-eastern South Africa to Uganda and Kenya.

It is a popular species to cultivate as bonsai due to its fast growth and hardy nature.

The bark of the tree is harvested, without harming the tree, to make barkcloth, an environmentally-friendly, renewable material. Skilled artisans incorporate this unique fabric into many modern uses, including fashion, accessories, housewares, interior design, and art.  The vision is to create sustainable jobs in East Africa by creating a global demand for barkcloth.

Mutuba trees can be harvested annually for up to 40 years, yielding up to 200 m2 of cloth individually.

References 
 Pooley, E. (1993). The Complete Field Guide to Trees of Natal, Zululand and Transkei. .

External links
 

natalensis
Trees of Africa
Flora of East Tropical Africa
Flora of South Tropical Africa
Flora of Southern Africa
Flora of Kenya
Flora of Mozambique
Flora of Uganda
Trees of South Africa